Ann Townsend (born December 5, 1962) is an American poet and essayist. She is the co-founder of VIDA: Women in the Literary Arts and a professor of English and director of the creative writing at Denison University, She has published three original poetry collections and co-edited a collection of lyric poems.

Early life 
Townsend was born and raised in Pittsburgh, Pennsylvania. She received her B.A. at Denison University in 1985. Townsend attended Ohio State University, where she received an M.A. and Ph.D.

Career 
Since 1992 Townsend has taught modern and contemporary poetry, creative writing, and literary translation at Denison University. She has also taught in the low-residency MFA program at Carlow University.

Her poetry and essays have appeared in such magazines as Poetry, The American Poetry Review, The Paris Review, and The Nation, among others. She has received fellowships from the Lannan Foundation, The National Endowment for the Arts, and the Ohio Arts Council, and is a winner of the Discovery Prize from The Nation. Her poems have been anthologized in American Poetry: The Next Generation (2000), The Bread Loaf Anthology of New American Poets (2000), The Extraordinary Tide: New Poetry by American Women (2001), and Legitimate Dangers: American Poets of the New Century (2006).

Her poetry collections include Dime Store Erotics (1998), The Coronary Garden (2005), and Dear Delinquent (2019). She is the co-editor, with David Baker, of the collection Radiant Lyre: Essays on Lyric Poetry (2007).

In August 2009, Townsend, along with notable American poets Erin Belieu and Cate Marvin, cofounded the national feminist organization VIDA: Women In Literary Arts. Since its founding, VIDA has published an annual report on the status of women writers by tabulating and comparing rates of publication between male and female authors. The VIDA survey, known as the VIDA Count, is the first of its kind and highlights the ways in which gender bias affects American literary publishing. In 2016, Townsend, Belieu and Marvin were the recipients of the Barnes and Noble Writers for Writers Prize, given in recognition of their work on behalf of the larger literary community.

Awards and honors 

 The Discovery/The Nation Prize. 1994.
Individual Artists Fellowship, The Ohio Arts Council. 1996.
 Individual Artists Fellowship, The National Endowment for the Arts. 2004
 Lannan Foundation Residency Fellowship. 2014.
 Barnes and Noble Writers for Writers Prize. 2016.

Works

Collections of poetry 

 Dime Store Erotics. Silverfish Review Press. 1998. 
 The Coronary Garden. Sarabande Books. 2005. 
 Dear Delinquent. Sarabande Books. 2019.

Edited collection 

 Radiant Lyre: Essays on Lyric Poems (with David Baker). Graywolf Press. 2007.

Works anthologized 

 The Pushcart Prize XX. 1996. 
 American Poetry: The Next Generation. 2000. 
 The Bread Loaf Anthology of New American Poets. 2000. 
 The Extraordinary Tide: New Poetry by American Women. 2001. 
 The Eye of the Poet: Six Views of the Art and Craft of Poetry. 2002. 
 Legitimate Dangers: American Poets of the New Century. 2006. 
 The Book of Irish American Poetry from the Eighteenth Century to the Present. 2007

References

External links 

 https://lannan.org/bios/ann-townsend
 https://www.poets.org/poetsorg/poet/ann-townsend
 https://www.poetryfoundation.org/poets/ann-townsend
 http://anntownsend.com/

Living people
1962 births
20th-century American poets
20th-century American women writers
21st-century American poets
21st-century American women writers
Denison University alumni
Denison University faculty
Ohio State University alumni
Writers from Pittsburgh
Poets from Pennsylvania
American translators
Poets from Ohio
American essayists
American literary critics
Women literary critics
American people of Irish descent
American women academics
American women critics